Balikuda-Erasama is a Vidhan Sabha constituency of Jagatsinghpur district, Odisha.

This constituency includes Balikuda block and Erasama block.

Elected Members

Fifteen elections were held between 1951 and 2014.
Elected members from the Balikuda-Erasama constituency are:
2019:(103): Raghunandan Das  (BJD)
2014: (103): Prasanta Kumar Muduli (BJD)
2009: (103): Prasanta Kumar Muduli (BJD)
2004: (37): Umesh Chandra Swain  (Congress)
2000: (37): Umesh Chandra Swain  (Congress)
1995: (37): Lalatendu Mohapatra  (Congress)
1990: (37): Umesh Chandra Swain (Janata Dal)
1985: (37): Jyotish Chandra Das  (Congress)
1980: (37): Basudev Mohapatra  (Congress-I)
1977: (37): Umesh Chandra Swain (Janata Party)
1974: (37): Basudeb Mohapatra (Congress)
1971: (35): Basudeb Mohapatra (Congress)
1967: (35): Baikunthanath Mohanty (PSP)
1961: (106): Bipin Bihari Das (Congress)
1957: (74): Baikunthanath Mohanty (PSP)
1951: (73): Pranakrushna Parija (Independent)

Election results

2014 Election Result
In 2014 election, Biju Janata Dal candidate Prasanta Kumar Muduli defeated  Indian National Congress candidate Lalatendu mohapatra by a margin of 29,354 votes.

2009 Election Results
In 2009 election, Biju Janata Dal candidate Prasanta Kumar Muduli defeated Indian National Congress candidate Umesh Chandra Swain by a margin of 31,385 votes.

Notes

References

Assembly constituencies of Odisha
Jagatsinghpur district